My First Two Hundred Years is a 1985 Hungarian drama film directed by Gyula Maár. It was entered into the 36th Berlin International Film Festival.

Cast
 Zoltán Bezerédi as Pál Királyhegyi
 Anna Kubik as Maud
 László Márkus as Krausz
 Béla Both as Krausz
 Jiří Adamíra as Film producer
 Mari Törőcsik as A filmcézár felesége
 Ferenc Paláncz as Surányi testvér
 Gábor Nagy as Nyilas tiszt
 György Kézdy as Henrik
 László Csákányi as Kondor
 Kati Sír as Nyilas pártszolgálatosnő
 János Gálvölgyi as Német tiszt
 Gyula Benkő as Kegyelmes úr
 Endre Harkányi as Ernő
 Péter Andorai as Betörő

References

External links

1985 films
1980s Hungarian-language films
1985 drama films
Films directed by Gyula Maár
Hungarian drama films